Sword of the Avenger is a 1948 American adventure film directed by Sidney Salkow and starring Ramon del Gado, Sigrid Gurie, and Ralph Morgan.

Plot
The setting of the film is the Philippines in 1827, while it was under Spanish rule. Roberto Balagtas (Delgado) is falsely arrested for treason and sent to prison where he is tortured. He escapes with other prisoners, but only Batagtas survives the escape, carrying with him a treasure map left by one of the others. He crosses paths with Ming Tang (Strong) and a group of Chinese smugglers, with whom he finds the treasure. The booty makes him extremely wealthy, and he changes his name to Don Diego Sebastian. He then goes back to the Philippines to seek his revenge.

Cast
Ramon del Gado (Rogelio dela Rosa) as Roberto Balagtas/Don Diego Sebastian
Sigrid Gurie as Maria Luisa
Ralph Morgan as Don Adolfo
Duncan Renaldo as Fernando
Leonard Strong as Ming Tang

References

External links
 
 

1948 films
1940s English-language films
American black-and-white films
American adventure drama films
1940s adventure drama films
Films directed by Sidney Salkow
Films set in the 1820s
Films set in the Philippines
1940s historical adventure films
American historical adventure films
Eagle-Lion Films films
1948 drama films
1940s American films